The 2002 Portuguese motorcycle Grand Prix was the eleventh round of the 2002 MotoGP Championship. It took place on the weekend of 6–8 September 2002 at the Autódromo do Estoril.

MotoGP classification

250 cc classification

125 cc classification

Championship standings after the race (MotoGP)

Below are the standings for the top five riders and constructors after round eleven has concluded.

Riders' Championship standings

Constructors' Championship standings

 Note: Only the top five positions are included for both sets of standings.

References

Portuguese motorcycle Grand Prix
Portuguese
Motorcycle Grand Prix